NBC University Theater (also known as NBC University Theater of the Air, NBC Theater of the Air or NBC Theater) was a brand the National Broadcasting Co. applied to a category of radio programming. Although not actually a university, some colleges and universities collaborated in some of the programming, either contributing to its content or including the programming in their curriculum. NBC University Theaters most well-known radio series was The World's Great Novels. NBC used the name "University Theater" or similar from about 1923–1947.

 Description 
Most NBC University Theater programming aired on NBC's Red Network, but the Blue Network (later to become ABC) also participated. The Armed Forces Radio Network also distributed some of the programs. About 1948, NBC replaced this category with NBC Presents.

 The World's Great Novels 
The World's Great Novels was one of the radio series included in NBC University Theater. The series was produced by Margaret Cuthbert and  directed by Homer Heck. It presented adaptations of classic novels, often described as "Anglo-American literature." The show was born The World's Great Novels''' on WMAQ, Chicago, and NBC from 1944 to 1948, and adopted its better known name when it relocated to Hollywood in July 1948.It initially aired Saturdays at 7:00 pm CST during the first 1944–45 season and then moved to Fridays at 11:30 pm. Music for the series was composed by Emil Soderstrom (né Emil Otto Edvard Söderström; 1901–1972) and conducted by Bernard "Whitey" Berquist (né Bernard H. Berquist; 1903–1962).

The Chicago-based programs were a production of The NBC University of the Air. Through agreements with the University of Louisville, the University of Tulsa, Kansas State Teachers College,  and Washington State College, listeners could receive college credit through accredited, radio-assisted literature correspondence courses. A study guide, The Handbook of the World's Great Novels, was available for 25 cents.

The series began October 28, 1944, with Henry Fielding's Tom Jones, followed by Voltaire's Candide and Jane Austen's Emma. Over the next four years, it aired adaptations of such novels as Kidnapped, The Last of the Mohicans, Thomas Hardy's The Mayor of Casterbridge, Moby-Dick, A Tale of Two Cities and War and Peace. Since this was a half-hour program, many of the novels were serialized in multi-part adaptations of two to six 30-minute episodes.

Chicago actors
The group of Chicago actors heard on the series included Larry Alexander, Ernie Andrews, Everett Clarke, Johnny Coons, Maurice Copeland, Harry Elders, Sidney Ellstrom, Charles Flynn, Donald Gallagher, Hilda Graham, Ken Griffin, Jonathan Hole, Geraldine Kay, Eloise Kummer, Jack Lester, Ken Nordine, Hope Summers and Lee Young. Some episodes were narrated by Nordine. The announcers were Charles Chan, John Conrad and Dave Garroway.

Guest commentators
Some shows in the series had guest speakers. Amy Loveman, an editor with The Saturday Review of Literature, was the guest commentator with the 1944 adaptation of Emma. The novelist Ida Alexa Ross Wylie was the guest commenting on Charles Dickens' The Pickwick Papers. The adaptation of Theodore Dreiser's Free (July 9, 1948) featured a brief talk by the Dean of the University of Chicago.

On July 23, 1948, the final program featured readings from different works by Thomas Wolfe.

The series was retooled by Cuthbert and renamed NBC University Theater (aka NBC University Theater of the Air, NBC Theater of the Air and NBC Theater) and moved from Chicago to Hollywood. That series was heard from July 30, 1948, to February 14, 1951.  In the new format, the program also included adaptations of short stories and plays in addition to novels and occasionally featured commentary on the original work by distinguished writers and critics. The new series won a Peabody Award in 1948 and was considered one of the most distinguished radio programs of its day; all the episodes from this period still survive.

The NBC University of the Air also produced a summer replacement series, American Novels, which was broadcast when The World's Great Novels was off during the summers of 1947 and 1948.

Some sources give the title of the 1944–48 series as The World's Greatest Novels, but there is no evidence this title was ever used.

 List of NBC University Theater series 
A partial list.

 NBC University of the Air series 

 1923–26 NBC University of The Air Talk
 1925–35 NBC University of The Air
 1928 Music Lectures
 1944–45 The American Story
 1944 Pursuit of Learning
 1944–45 We Came This Way
 1944 They Call Me Joe
 1944–48 The Worlds Great Novels
 1945 The Story of Music
 1944–46 The Land of The Free
 1946 Featuring Our Families
 1946 Tales of The Foreign Service
 1947 American Novels

 NBC Inter-American University of The Air series 
Between 1942 and 1946, NBC made a distinction between the "University of the Air" and the "Inter-American University of the Air". The former tended to be focused on the United States while the latter was more global.

 July 6, 1942 The Lands of The Free
 October 10, 1942 Music of The New World
 1943 For This We Fight
 1943 Music of The New World
 1944 The Department of State Speaks
 1944–45 The American Story
 1945 Our Foreign Policy
 1946 Your United Nations
 1946 Home Around The World
 1946 Concert of Nations

See also

Short storyNBC Presents: Short Story''

References

Listen to
Megalo: NBC University Theater: A Farewell to Arms by Ernest Hemingway

External links

Frank M. Passage log
Jerry Haendiges Vintage Radio Logs: NBC University Theater of the Air
History of Public Broadcasting in the United States: "Tuning Out Education" by Eugene E. Leach, Ph.D.
The Digital Deli Too: "N" Radio Program logs
 Complete Archive for Download at archive.org

1940s American radio programs
Plays based on novels
Peabody Award-winning radio programs
NBC radio programs